Arthur Yamga (born 7 September 1995) is a French professional footballer who plays as a right back or left winger for Esteghlal. Besides France, he has played in Italy, Portugal, Denmark, and Iran.

Club career

ChievoVerona

Loan to Robur Siena
On 8 August 2015, Yamga signed a one-year loan with the Serie C side Robur Siena. On 6 September, Yamga made his professional debut in Serie C for Robur Siena in a 1–1 home draw against Carrarese, he was replaced by Gianmarco De Feo in the 78th minute. On 13 December, Yamga scored his first professional goal for Robur Siena in the 27th minute of a 3–0 away win over Savona. On 10 January 2016, Yamga played his first entire match for Robur Siena and he scored twice in a 2–0 away win over Ancona. On 31 January he scored his fourth goal in the third minute of a 1–0 away win against Prato. Yamga ended his loan to Robur Siena with 25 appearances, 4 goals and 1 assist.

Loan to Arezzo
On 1 July 2016, Yamga was signed by Serie C side Arezzo on a season-long loan deal. On 31 July, Yamga made his debut for Arezzo in the first round of Coppa Italia, he was replaced by Sergio Sabatini in the 79th minute of a 2–1 away win over Carrarese. On 7 August he played in the second round of Coppa Italia, he was replaced in the 78th minute of a 2–0 away defeat against Cesena. On 28 August, Yamga made his debut in Serie C for Arezzo, as a starter, playing the entire match and scoring his first goal for Arezzo in the 19th minute of a 2–2 home draw against Como. On 24 October he scored his second goal in the 64th minute of a 1–1 away draw against Livorno. On 8 April 2017, Yamga scored his third goal in the 35th minute of a 3–3 home draw against Giana Erminio. Yamga ended his loan to Arezzo with 31 appearances, 3 goals and 2 assists.

Loan to Carpi and Pescara
On 31 August 2017, Yamga signed a one-year loan with the Carpi. On 3 September, Yamga made his debut in Serie B for Carpi as a substitute replacing Jacopo Manconi in the 70th minute, but he was replaced by Riccardo Brosco, for an injury, in the 89th minute of a 1–0 away win over Spezia. On 24 October he played his second match for Carpi, again as a substitute, replacing Enej Jelenič in the 76th minute of a 3–1 home defeat against Palermo. On 29 November, Yamga played in the fourth round of Coppa Italia as a substitute replacing Davide Vitturini in the 86th minute of a 2–0 away defeat against Torino. In January 2018, Yamga was re-called to ChievoVerona leaving Carpi with only 3 appearances, all as a substitute.

On 23 January 2018, Yamga was signed by Serie B club Pescara on a six-month loan deal with an option to buy.

Loan to Châteauroux
On 3 September 2018, Yamga was loaned to Ligue 2 club LB Châteauroux.

Aves
On 22 July 2019, he signed a 3-year contract with the Portuguese club Desportivo das Aves.

Vejle BK
On 23 September 2020, Yamga joined newly promoted Danish Superliga club Vejle Boldklub on a deal until the summer 2022.

Esteghlal
After a successful season at Vejle, he was transferred to Esteghlal F.C. with a free transfer and he scored two goals in his debut.

After a while in Esteghlal, he became the team's penalty taker and managed to record an extraordinary record of 100% success in penalty kicks. Arthur Yamga is very popular among Esteghlal fans.

Personal life
Yamga was born in France and is of Cameroonian descent.

Career statistics

Honours 

ChievoVerona Primavera

 Campionato Nazionale Primavera: 2013–14

Esteghlal

 Persian Gulf Pro League: 2021–22
 Iranian Super Cup: 2022

References

External links
 
 

1996 births
Living people
French footballers
French sportspeople of Cameroonian descent
Footballers from Paris
Association football wingers
A.C. ChievoVerona players
A.C.N. Siena 1904 players
S.S. Arezzo players
A.C. Carpi players
Delfino Pescara 1936 players
LB Châteauroux players
C.D. Aves players
Vejle Boldklub players
Esteghlal F.C. players
Serie B players
Serie C players
Ligue 2 players
French expatriate footballers
Expatriate footballers in Italy
French expatriate sportspeople in Italy
Expatriate footballers in Portugal
French expatriate sportspeople in Portugal
Expatriate men's footballers in Denmark
French expatriate sportspeople in Denmark
Expatriate footballers in Iran
French expatriate sportspeople in Iran